Christina DiMartino (born November 6, 1986) is an American professional soccer midfielder. She previously played for the Philadelphia Independence of the WPS and was a member of the United States women's national soccer team.

Early life
Born in Long Island, New York to Daniel and Patrice DiMartino, Christina attended Massapequa High School in Massapequa, New York where she was a four-year varsity letterwinner and two-time Nassau County Player of the Year. DiMartino was a two-time Parade Magazine High School All-American in 2004 and 2005. In 2004, she was named NSCAA/adidas National High School Player of the Year, NSCAA/adidas High School All-American, and Gatorade State Player of the Year for New York. She was ranked as the number 12 overall recruit in the country and sixth best forward by Student Sports Magazine and Soccer Buzz named her a Top-25 U.S. High School Recruit.

DiMartino played for the Albertson Express and helped the club team capture four state championships. The team also won the WAGS Tournament and the Disney Cup in 2004.

UCLA
During DiMartino's freshman year at UCLA, she was the only freshman to start in all twenty-six matches for the Bruins, scoring five goals and assisting on five.

Praised for her creativity on the field, DiMartino became one of the nation's top attacking midfielders in women's college soccer, helping the Bruins to four consecutive College Cups throughout her career.

DiMartino was a semifinalist for the prestigious Hermann Trophy in 2007, and was a finalist for the trophy in 2008.

Playing career

Club

FC Gold Pride
DiMartino was selected third overall in the 2009 WPS Draft, going to FC Gold Pride. In her first season with the club, she started 18 games and recorded one assist.

Los Angeles Sol
In January 2010, DiMartino was traded to the Los Angeles Sol.

St. Louis Athletica
After the Sol ceased operations on January 28, 2010; in the ensuing dispersal draft for the players, DiMartino was selected by Saint Louis Athletica. On May 27, 2010, the Athletica folded in the middle of the 2010 WPS season due to financial problems, making all Athletica players free agents on June 1.

Philadelphia Independence
DiMartino was then signed by the Philadelphia Independence, joining younger sister Gina DiMartino on the squad coached by the sisters' former youth team coach, Paul Riley.

FC Kansas City
DiMartino was selected in the fifth round (38th overall) of the 2013 NWSL Supplemental Draft by FC Kansas City for the inaugural season of the NWSL but did not play for the team during the league's inaugural season.

International
DiMartino was a member of the fourth-place United States U-20 women's national soccer team that competed in the 2006 FIFA U-20 Women's World Championship in Russia, alongside UCLA teammates Danesha Adams, Lauren Cheney, Erin Hardy, and Valerie Henderson. After 2006, she also saw time in the United States U-23 women's national soccer team player pool. 
Her first appearance for the senior team was during the Four Nations Tournament in January 2008, appearing in a match against Finland and assisting on Lauren Cheney's goal. DiMartino scored her first goal for the senior national team in March 2009 during the Algarve Cup, against Denmark.

DiMartino has also made appearances for the U-16, U-17, and U-19 teams.

International goals

Career statistics

Club career

International career

Personal
DiMartino has two younger sisters who have played at the youth national level: Gina DiMartino, a member of the United States U-20 women's national soccer team that won the 2008 FIFA U-20 Women's World Cup in Chile, and Vicki DiMartino, a member of the United States U-17 women's national soccer team that was runner-up at the inaugural 2008 FIFA U-17 Women's World Cup in New Zealand.

References

External links
 
 US Soccer player profile
  UCLA player profile
 Philadelphia Independence player profile

United States women's international soccer players
UCLA Bruins women's soccer players
FC Gold Pride players
Saint Louis Athletica players
Philadelphia Independence players
Living people
1986 births
American women's soccer players
Women's Premier Soccer League Elite players
Women's Professional Soccer players
Apollon Ladies F.C. players
People from Massapequa, New York
Women's association football midfielders
United States women's under-20 international soccer players
Massapequa High School alumni